Marko Jarić (born 12 October 1978) is a Serbian former professional basketball player. Standing at 2.01 m (6 ft 7 in), he mainly played the shooting guard position. He also represented the senior FR Yugoslavian national basketball team internationally. Jarić was an All-EuroLeague First Team member in 2002.

Early life
Jarić was born in Belgrade, SR Serbia, SFR Yugoslavia, the son of Srećko Jarić, a well-known Yugoslav professional basketball player, who played as a point guard for Radnički Belgrade, and was regarded by head basketball coach Dušan Ivković as, the "biggest talent that he ever had under his charge". Jarić began playing basketball with the youth teams of the Serbian club Red Star Belgrade.

Professional career

Europe
Jarić began his professional career in the 1996–97 season, with the Greek Basket League club Peristeri. With Peristeri, he played two seasons in the European-wide 3rd tier level FIBA Korać Cup. He then spent the next 4 seasons playing in Europe's top-tier level EuroLeague, with the Italian clubs Fortitudo Bologna and Virtus Bologna.

He became the first player ever to win back-to-back Italian League championships, on two teams. He won the Italian League championship in 2000, with Fortitudo Bologna, and in 2001, with Virtus Bologna.

NBA
Jarić was selected as the 30th overall draft pick, by the Los Angeles Clippers, in the 2000 NBA draft. After playing in 3 NBA seasons with the Clippers, he was traded to the Minnesota Timberwolves, on 12 August 2005, along with Lionel Chalmers, by the Clippers, in exchange for Sam Cassell and a future first-round draft pick. He was traded to the Grizzlies, on 26 June 2008, in an eight-player deal, involving rookie shooting guard O. J. Mayo, and rookie power forward Kevin Love.

For the 2009–10 NBA season, Jarić and the Memphis Grizzlies, mutually agreed that Jarić would not attend the team's training camp, or any of their preseason games. Jarić was granted permission to seek a new team, and a possible contract buyout, for the remaining 2 years and $15 million of his contract. Jarić's final NBA game was played on April 15th, 2009 in a 98 - 90 victory over the Atlanta Hawks. In his final game, he played for 23 minutes and recorded 5 rebounds, 2 assists, 2 steals but no points.

Back to Europe
After securing his release from the NBA's Memphis Grizzlies, Jarić then signed with Spanish Liga ACB club Real Madrid, on 22 December 2009. On 14 January 2011, he signed with the Italian LBA club Montepaschi Siena, through the end of the 2010–11 season.

NBA comeback attempt
In October 2012, Jarić signed with the NBA's Chicago Bulls. However, he was waived on 24 October. In September 2013, he signed with the Brooklyn Nets. However, he was waived on 15 October. He then retired from playing professional basketball.

National team career

FR Yugoslavia junior national team
As a junior FR Yugoslavia national team player, Jarić won the gold medal at the 1998 FIBA Europe Under-20 Championship.

FR Yugoslavia senior national team
As a member of the senior FR Yugoslavia national basketball team, Jarić won gold medals at both the 2001 EuroBasket and the 2002 FIBA World Championship. He also played with them at the 2003 EuroBasket and the 2005 EuroBasket. He represented the senior Serbian national basketball team at the 2007 EuroBasket.

Career statistics

NBA

Regular season

|-
| align="left" | 2002–03
| align="left" | L.A. Clippers
| 66 || 12 || 20.9 || .401 || .319 || .752 || 2.4 || 2.9 || 1.5 || .2 || 7.4
|-
| align="left" | 2003–04
| align="left" | L.A. Clippers
| 58 || 50 || 30.3 || .388 || .340 || .733 || 3.0 || 4.8 || 1.6 || .3 || 8.5
|-
| align="left" | 2004–05
| align="left" | L.A. Clippers
| 50 || 41 || 33.1 || .414 || .371 || .720 || 3.2 || 6.1 || 1.7 || .3 || 9.9
|-
| align="left" | 2005–06
| align="left" | Minnesota
| 75 || 49 || 28.0 || .399 || .301 || .688 || 3.1 || 3.9 || 1.4 || .3 || 7.8
|-
| align="left" | 2006–07
| align="left" | Minnesota
| 70 || 13 || 22.2 || .418 || .376 || .761 || 2.6 || 2.1 || 1.1 || .2 || 5.3
|-
| align="left" | 2007–08
| align="left" | Minnesota
| 75 || 56 || 29.2 || .430 || .362 || .742 || 3.0 || 4.1 || 1.3 || .4 || 8.3
|-
| align="left" | 2008–09
| align="left" | Memphis
| 53 || 0 || 11.4 || .331 || .393 || .707 || 1.2 || 1.4 || .5 || .2 || 2.6
|- class="sortbottom"
| style="text-align:center;" colspan="2"| Career
| 447 || 221 || 25.2 || .404 || .344 || .730 || 2.7 || 3.6 || 1.3 || .3 || 7.1

EuroLeague

|-
| style="text-align:left;background:#AFE6BA;"| 2000–01†
| style="text-align:left;"| Bologna
| 22 || 16 || 28.7 || .439 || .309 || .697 || 3.0 || 2.3 || 2.0 || .2 || 10.4 || 10.2
|-
| style="text-align:left;"| 2001–02
| style="text-align:left;"| Bologna
| 21 || 20 || 28.2 || .482 || .268 || .595 || 4.3 || 2.5 || 2.2 || .1 || 13.4 || 14.6
|-
| style="text-align:left;"| 2009–10
| style="text-align:left;"| Real Madrid
| 12 || 10 || 25.8 || .378 || .440 || .682 || 5.2 || 1.7 || 1.3 || .2 || 7.1 || 7.7
|-
| style="text-align:left;"| 2010–11
| style="text-align:left;"| Montepaschi
| 12 || 3 || 12.5 || .433 || .158 || .750 || 1.4 || 1.3 || 1.0 || .0 || 5.1 || 3.9
|- class="sortbottom"
| style="text-align:center;" colspan="2"| Career
| 67 || 49 || 25.1 || .448 || .294 || .656 || 3.3 || 2.1 || 1.8 || .1 || 9.8 || 10.0

Personal life
Jarić has an older sister named Tamara, and a younger brother named Nikola (b. 1987), who lives and plays basketball in Switzerland.

On 12 June 2008, Jarić became engaged to Brazilian supermodel Adriana Lima. The couple wed in Jackson Hole, Wyoming, USA, on Valentine's Day 2009. They have two daughters. The couple announced their separation on 2 May 2014, after five years of marriage. The divorce was finalized in March 2016.

Jarić also holds Greek citizenship, under the name Marko Latsis (Greek: Μάρκο Λάτσης), which was the name he played basketball under in Greece.

See also 
 List of Serbian NBA players

References

External links

 
 Marko Jarić at acb.com 
 Marko Jarić at draftexpress.com
 Marko Jarić at euroleague.net
 
 Marko Jarić at fibaeurope.com
 Marko Jarić at legabasket.it 
 Marko Jarić at nba.com
 

1978 births
Living people
2002 FIBA World Championship players
FIBA EuroBasket-winning players
FIBA World Championship-winning players
Fortitudo Pallacanestro Bologna players
Greek men's basketball players
Greek Basket League players
Greek people of Serbian descent
Greek expatriate basketball people in Serbia
KK Crvena zvezda youth players
Lega Basket Serie A players
Liga ACB players
Los Angeles Clippers draft picks
Los Angeles Clippers players
Memphis Grizzlies players
Mens Sana Basket players
Minnesota Timberwolves players
National Basketball Association players from Serbia
Naturalized citizens of Greece
Peristeri B.C. players
Point guards
Real Madrid Baloncesto players
Serbia men's national basketball team players
Serbian men's basketball players
Serbian expatriate basketball people in Greece
Serbian expatriate basketball people in Italy
Serbian expatriate basketball people in Spain
Serbian expatriate basketball people in the United States
Shooting guards
Small forwards
Basketball players from Belgrade
Virtus Bologna players
Yugoslav men's basketball players